Presidential elections were held in El Salvador on  21 March 2004. Antonio Saca of the Nationalist Republican Alliance (ARENA) party won the election with 57% of the vote, avoiding the need for a run-off on 2 May.

Candidates
There were two front-running candidates:
Antonio Saca of the ruling Nationalist Republican Alliance (ARENA). In his campaign, Saca embraced the free-market and pro-US policies followed by his predecessor and fellow , Francisco Flores. He was also the clear favorite of the Bush administration.
Schafik Handal of the opposition Farabundo Martí National Liberation Front (FMLN). Handal sought to capitalize on discontent over slow economic growth, increasing crime, and income disparities between the poor and the tiny elite. He pledged to raise the tax burden on the rich and to re-establish diplomatic relations with Cuba.

There were also two additional candidates. However, pre-vote opinion polls consistently placed both of them far behind the two leaders:
Héctor Silva Argüello, the Christian Democratic Party–United Democratic Centre alliance candidate.
José Rafael Machuca Zelaya, representing the Party of National Conciliation (PCN).

The election was monitored by 270 international observers and El Salvador's own Tribunal Supremo Electoral, an institution created in 1992 to reform and validate the country's electoral system. Some 17,000 police were on security duty during the election.

Foreign interference
The U.S. government under George W. Bush interfered in the elections by threatening a deterioration of the bilateral relations in case of a victory by FMLN's candidate Schafik Handal. Bush's Assistant Secretary of State for Western Hemisphere Affairs, Otto Reich, stated that the U.S. government was "concerned about the impact that an FMLN victory could have on the commercial, economic, and migration-related relations of the U.S. with El Salvador."

Results
The voter turnout of 67% was the highest in Salvadoran history. The Tribunal Supremo Electoral confirmed Saca as the winner on Monday 22 March. Handal recognized Saca's victory, but chose not to congratulate him. Saca announced his intention to seek reconciliation with the opposition FMLN, in an effort to heal old divisions from the country's violent past. Saca selected Ana Vilma de Escobar to be his vice-president. She was previously the director of the Salvadoran Social Security Institute (ISSS). The new government took office on 1 June 2004.

References

External links
 U.S. choice elected in El Salvador (Seattle Times)
 ARENA celebra triunfo y promete que ?no cerrarán las puertas" (CoLatino)
 Contundente gane de areneros (El Salvador)
 New Salvador President Vows to Work with Ex-Rebels

Presidential elections in El Salvador
El Salvador
Presidential election